Small Vices is the 24th Spenser novel by Robert B. Parker.

Plot
The story follows Boston-based PI Spenser as he tries to solve the murder of a college student.

Recurring characters
Spenser
Dr. Susan Silverman, Ph.D
Hawk
Lee Farrell
Martin Quirk
Frank Belson
Vinnie Morris
Gino Fish
Paul Giacomin
Henry Cimoli
Rita Fiori
Ives
Patricia Utley
Pearl the Wonder Dog
Healy
Rugar

In other media

Spenser: Small Vices, is a made-for-TV movie starring Joe Mantegna as Spenser.

Mantegna subsequently reprised the role in Spenser: Thin Air and Spenser: Walking Shadow.

Cast
 Joe Mantegna as Spenser
 Marcia Gay Harden as Susan
 Shiek Mahmud-Bey as Hawk
 Joanna Miles as Evans
 Robert B. Parker as Ives

References

External links
 The page on the book from the author's website
 Spenser on Screen from The Robert B. Parker website
 

1997 American novels
Novels set in Boston
Spenser (novel series)
American novels adapted into films
American novels adapted into television shows